National Broadcasting Service may refer to any of the following:

National Broadcasting Service, former name of the Australian Broadcasting Corporation
National Broadcasting Services of Thailand
National Broadcasting Service of Trinidad and Tobago, former name of the now-defunct National Broadcasting Network (Trinidad and Tobago)